At the 1960 Summer Olympics in Rome, two events in modern pentathlon were contested.

Medal summary

Medal table

Participating nations

A total of 60 athletes from 23 nations competed at the Rome Games:

Results

Individual

Team

References

External links
 

 
1960 Summer Olympics events
1960